The Passamaquoddy (Maliseet-Passamaquoddy: Peskotomuhkati) are a Native American/First Nations people who live in northeastern North America. Their traditional homeland, Peskotomuhkatik, straddles the Canadian province of New Brunswick and the U.S. state of Maine in a region called Dawnland. They are one of the constituent nations of the Wabanaki Confederacy.

The Passamaquoddy Tribe in Maine is a federally-recognized tribe. The Passamaquoddy people in Canada have an organized government, but do not have official First Nations status.

Etymology
The name "Passamaquoddy" is an anglicization of the Passamaquoddy word peskotomuhkati, the prenoun form (prenouns being a linguistic feature of Algonquian languages) of Peskotomuhkat (pestəmohkat), their endonym, or the name that they use for themselves. Peskotomuhkat literally means "pollock-spearer" or "those of the place where pollock are plentiful", reflecting the importance of this fish in their culture. Their method of fishing was spear-fishing, rather than angling or using nets. Passamaquoddy Bay is shared by both New Brunswick and Maine; its name was derived by the English settlers from the Passamaquoddy people.

History

The Passamaquoddy had an oral history supported with visual imagery, such as birchbark etching and petrographs prior to European contact. Among the Algonquian-speaking tribes of the loose Wabanaki Confederacy, they occupied coastal regions along the Bay of Fundy, Passamaquoddy Bay, and Gulf of Maine, and along the St. Croix River and its tributaries. They had seasonal patterns of settlement. In the winter, they dispersed and hunted inland. In the summer, they gathered more closely together on the coast and islands, and primarily harvested seafood, including marine mammals, mollusks, crustaceans, and fish.

Settlers of European descent repeatedly forced the Passamaquoddy off their original lands from the 1800s.

Passamaquoddy have also lived on off-reservation trust lands in five Maine counties. These lands total almost four times the size of the reservations proper. They are located in northern and western Somerset County, northern Franklin County, northeastern Hancock County, western Washington County, and several locations in eastern and western Penobscot County. The total land area of these areas is 373.888 km2 (144.359 sq mi). As of the 2000 census, no residents were on these trust lands.

The Passamaquoddy also live in Charlotte County, New Brunswick, Canada, where they have a chief and organized government. They maintain active land claims in Canada but do not have legal status there as a First Nation. Some Passamaquoddy continue to seek the return of territory now within present-day St. Andrews, New Brunswick, which they claim as Qonasqamkuk, a Passamaquoddy ancestral capital and burial ground.

Populations and languages
The total Passamaquoddy population is around 3,576 people. About 500 people, most if not all over the age of 50, speak the Malecite-Passamaquoddy language, shared (other than minor differences in dialect) with the neighboring and related Maliseet people. It belongs to the Algonquian branch of the Algic language family. The University of Maine published a comprehensive Passamaquoddy Dictionary in 2008. Another resource for the language is the online Passamaquoddy-Maliseet Language Portal, which includes many videos, subtitled in English and Passamaquoddy, of native speakers conversing in the language. Most of the people speak English as their first language.

While the Passamaquoddy population in Canada is much smaller than that in Maine, it has a formal structure and a chief, Hugh Akagi. Most of its people speak French and English. It is not recognized by the Canadian government as constituting a First Nation. In 2004, Chief Akagi was authorized to represent the Passamaquoddy at events marking the 400th anniversary of French settlement of St Croix Island (the first French effort at permanent settlement in the New World). This indicates that the government had acknowledged the tribe to some extent, and progress is being made in formal recognition.

Special political status in Maine 

The Passamaquoddy, along with the neighboring Penobscot, are given special political status in Maine. Both groups are allowed to send a nonvoting representative to the Maine House of Representatives. Although these representatives cannot vote, they may sponsor any legislation regarding American Indian affairs, and may co-sponsor any other legislation.

Notable Passamaquoddy
 David Moses Bridges (Passamaquoddy, 1962–2017), Sipayik, birchbark artist and canoe maker
 Simon Dumont, freestyle skier
 Tomah Joseph (1837–1914), governor, guide, and artist
 Francis Joseph Neptune, former Sakom
 Molly Neptune Parker, master basketmaker 
 Geo Soctomah Neptune, master basketmaker
 Rena Newell, tribal member of the Maine House of Representatives
 Wayne Newell, educator, singer, language preservationist, author, former tribal state representative, tribal council member, appointed to the National Advisory Council on Indian Education twice, recognized by the US Bureau of Indian Affairs as a National Treasure in Education
 Donald Soctomah, former tribal state representative, tribal historic preservation officer
 Madonna Soctomah, tribal council member, former state representative

Maps
Maps showing the approximate locations of areas occupied by members of the Wabanaki Confederacy (from north to south):

See also
 Joint Tribal Council of the Passamaquoddy Tribe v. Morton (1st Cir. 1975)
Passanaquoddy Tribe reacquires stolen land on Pine Island, Bangor Daily News 18 May 2021

References

Notes

Sources
 Indian Township Reservation and Passamaquoddy Trust Land, Maine United States Census Bureau

Further reading
 Sockabasin, Allen J.  2007. An Upriver Passamaquoddy. Thomaston, Maine: Tilbury House

External links
 Passamaquoddy Tribal Government Web Site (Pleasant Point)
 Passamaquoddy Tribal Government Web Site (Indian Township)
 Passamaquoddy-Maliseet Language Portal (includes dictionary and videos)
 The Boston Globe Magazine, October 27, 1985 issue, article by Peter Anderson
 Contribution to Passamaquoddy Folk-Lore, by J. Walter Fewkes, reprinted from the Journal of American Folk-Lore, October–December, 1890, from Project Gutenberg
  Passamaquoddy Origins
 Acadian Commemorative Website
 "An Unlikely Handshake Alters the Course of Maine's History," Portland Press Herald, July 5, 2014.

 
Algonquian peoples
Indigenous peoples of the Northeastern Woodlands
Native American history of Maine
Wabanaki Confederacy
Native American tribes in Maine
Federally recognized tribes in the United States
First Nations in Atlantic Canada
Algonquian ethnonyms